Broadway Is My Beat, a radio crime drama, ran on CBS from February 27, 1949 to August 1, 1954. With Anthony Ross portraying Times Square Detective Danny Clover, the show originated from New York during its first three months on the air. For the remainder of the series, the role of Detective Danny Clover was portrayed by Larry Thor. The series featured music by Robert Stringer, and scripts by Peter Lyon. John Dietz directed for producer Lester Gottlieb (eventually succeeding him as producer). Bern Bennett was the original announcer.

Beginning with the July 7, 1949 episode, the series was broadcast from Hollywood with producer Elliott Lewis directing a new cast in scripts by Morton S. Fine and David Friedkin.

Characters and story
The opening theme of "I'll Take Manhattan" introduced Detective Danny Clover, a hardened New York City cop who worked homicide "from Times Square to Columbus Circle—the gaudiest, the most violent, the lonesomest mile in the world."

Danny Clover narrated the tales of the Great White Way to the accompaniment of music by Wilbur Hatch and Alexander Courage, and the recreation of Manhattan's aural tapestry required the talents of three sound effects technicians (David Light, Ralph Cummings, Ross Murray). Bill Anders was the show's announcer, as was Joe Walters.

The supporting cast included regulars Charles Calvert (as Sgt. Gino Tartaglia) and Jack Kruschen (as Sgt. Muggavan), with episodic roles filled by television, radio, and film stars such as Eve McVeagh, and such radio actors as Irene Tedrow, Barney Phillips, Virginia Gregg, Anthony Barrett, Herb Butterfield, Lamont Johnson, Herb Ellis, Hy Averback, Edgar Barrier, Betty Lou Gerson, Cathy Lewis, Harry Bartell, Sheldon Leonard, Martha Wentworth, Lawrence Dobkin, Howard McNear, and Mary Jane Croft.

Closing

Time was elastic, a fairly easy trick in the theater of the mind. Stories closed, more often than not on a pensive, melancholy note, quickly after the climax of the program. Rarely was the case reviewed; more likely Clover would philosophize, as in the show's opening, with a bit of prose that ran from purple to stunningly poignant, ending in a reprise of the show's setup, e.g.:

Critical response
A review in the trade publication Variety called the program "another whodunit with an incidental Gotham background that should appeal to the mystery fans." The review also mentioned "smoothly meshing production gears, solid performances by an ace cast and some firstrate (sic) musical scoring by Robert Stringer."

References

External links
Script: Broadway Is My Beat: "The Tom Keeler Murder Case" (8/22/51)
Broadway Is My Beat series log (broadcast dates and titles for most episodes)

Listen
Broadway Is My Beat radio shows (96 episodes)
RadioLovers: Broadway Is My Beat: "John Rand"

American radio dramas
1940s American radio programs
1950s American radio programs
CBS Radio programs